The Port of Vancouver is the largest port in Canada and the fourth largest in North America by tonnes of cargo, facilitating trade between Canada and more than 170 world economies. The port is managed by the Vancouver Fraser Port Authority, which was created in 2008 as an amalgamation of the former Port of Vancouver, the North Fraser Port Authority, and the Fraser River Port Authority. It is the principal authority for shipping and port-related land and sea use in the Metro Vancouver region.

History

Predecessors 
Prior to the formation of the new authority, there were three separate port authorities in the Metro Vancouver region: the Port of Vancouver, which was the largest port in Canada; the Fraser River Port Authority; and the North Fraser Port Authority.

The Vancouver Port Authority was responsible for the Port of Vancouver, which was the largest port in Canada and the Pacific Northwest. The port had 25 major terminals. The port first began operations with the opening of Ballantyne Pier in 1923. In 2005/2006, the port handled 79.4 million tonnes of cargo, 1.8 million containers, 910,172 cruise passengers, and 2,677 foreign vessels. The authority was responsible for 233 km of coastline from Vancouver to the Canada–United States border.

The Fraser River Port Authority was created in 1913 to manage ports along the Fraser River. It was the second largest port in Vancouver and extended along the main arm of the river eastward to the Fraser Valley at Kanaka Creek, and north along the Pitt River to Pitt Lake. The Port's jurisdiction encompassed 270 kilometres of shoreline that border nine different municipalities in the Lower Mainland. In 2007, the port handled 36 million tonnes of cargo, 191,000 TEUs of containerized cargo, and 573 cargo vessels. The cargo at the port consisted of logs, cement, general cargo, steel, and automobiles. Its tenants included several large auto ports, making it the largest auto port in Canada.

The North Fraser Port Authority was incorporated in 1913 as the North Fraser Harbour Commissioners. It was the smallest of the three ports and was located on the north arm of the Fraser River from the University of British Columbia to New Westminster. The traffic of the port mainly consisted of logs and wood fibre. The port covered around 920 hectares of land and water lots and it handled nearly 18 million tonnes of cargo in 2004.

Merger 
Although the ports were financially self-sufficient, the federal legislation governing the authorities generated some inefficiency because the port authorities, legally separate entities, were forced to compete with each other economically for business. This inefficiency came to the attention of the local media in 2006 when it was found that the recently expanded Fraser Surrey Docks, operated by the Fraser River Port Authority in New Westminster, were sitting idle after their principal shipping partner, CP Ships, relocated to the Port of Vancouver, already nearing capacity. Some critics opposed the possible merger as they felt the new authority would not recognize the unique concerns of the Fraser River.

To increase the efficiency of the ports of Metro Vancouver, the federal Minister of Transport permitted the three authorities to study the benefits of amalgamating in June 2006. The resulting report highlighted several benefits of amalgamation, and on June 16, Transport Canada granted a "certificate of intent to amalgamate port authorities". On December 21, 2007, the government of Canada published a certificate of amalgamation that allowed the three port authorities to merge into one effective January 1, 2008. The resulting entity became known as Port Metro Vancouver.

Post-merger 
Since 2013, the Vancouver Fraser Port Authority also merged with Canada Place Corporation, which formerly operated Canada Place as a subsidiary of Port of Vancouver.

On April 6, 2016, the port authority dropped "Port Metro Vancouver" from its branding and re-adopted "Port of Vancouver" to refer to Vancouver's port, while using "Vancouver Fraser Port Authority" when referencing activities or decisions of the port authority.

Responsibility 
The Port of Vancouver is managed by the Vancouver Fraser Port Authority, formerly called Port Metro Vancouver. It was created with the responsibility for the stewardship of the federal port lands in and around Vancouver, British Columbia. It was created as a financially self-sufficient company that is accountable to the federal minister of transport and operates pursuant to the Canada Marine Act. The port authority and port terminals and tenants are responsible for the efficient and reliable movement of goods and passengers, integrating environmental, social and economic sustainability initiatives into all areas of port operations.

In 2014, the Port of Vancouver was the fourth largest port by tonnage in the Americas, 29th in the world in terms of total cargo and 44th in the world by container traffic. The port enables the trade of approximately $240 billion in goods. Port activities sustain 115,300 jobs, $7 billion in wages, and $11.9 billion in GDP across Canada.

Major initiatives 

The Container Capacity Improvement Program (CCIP) is the port's long-term strategy to meet anticipated growth in container traffic, which is expected to triple by the year 2030. The program consists of projects that both improve the efficiency of existing infrastructure and explore opportunities to build new infrastructure as demand rises. CCIP projects include the Deltaport Terminal Road and Rail Improvement Project (DTRRIP) and the proposed Roberts Bank Terminal 2 project.

DTTRIP will result in infrastructure upgrades that would increase Deltaport's container capacity by 600,000 TEUs (twenty-foot equivalent units), within the terminal's existing footprint. The Roberts Bank Terminal 2 project is a proposed marine container terminal that could provide an additional capacity of 2.4 million TEUs per year to meet forecasted demand until 2030.

North Shore Trade Area projects
 Western Level Lower Level Route Extension
 Pemberton Avenue Grade Separation 
 Low Level Road Realignment
 Neptune/Cargill Grade Separation
 Brooksbank Avenue Underpass
 Lynn Creek Rail Bridge Addition

South Shore Trade Area projects
 Powell Street Grade Separation
 Stewart Street/Victoria Overpass

Environmental initiatives
 Enhancing Cetacean Habitat and Observation (ECHO) Program (2014-2021)

Terminals and facilities 

Port of Vancouver offers 30 deep-sea and domestic marine terminals that service five business sectors: automobiles, break-bulk, bulk, containers, and cruise.

Automobile terminals
 Annacis Auto Terminals
 Richmond Auto Terminal

Break-bulk terminals
 Fraser Surrey Docks
 Lynnterm

Bulk terminals
 Alliance Grain Terminal
 Cargill
 Cascadia
 Chemtrade Chemicals
 Fibreco
 Fraser Grain Terminal
 G3 Terminal Vancouver
 IOCO
 Lantic Inc.
 Neptune Bulk Terminals
 Pacific Coast Terminals
 Pacific Elevators
 Parkland Terminal
 Richardson International
 Shellburn
 Suncor Energy - Burrard Products Terminal
 Univar Canada Terminal
 Vancouver Wharves
 West Coast Reduction
 Westridge Marine Terminal
 Westshore Terminals

Container terminals
 Centerm
 Deltaport
 Fraser Surrey Docks
 Vanterm

Cruise terminals
 Canada Place

Incidents
In January 2019, the cargo ship Ever Summit crashed into a crane. There was no death or injuries.

See also 
 History of Squamish and Tsleil-Waututh longshoremen, 1863-1963
 List of ports and harbors of the Pacific Ocean

References

External links
 International Shipping in British Columbia

Transport in Greater Vancouver
Vancouver
Economy of Vancouver
Port authorities in Canada